Newbern or New Bern may refer to:

People 
 George Newbern (born 1964), American actor
 Hambone Willie Newbern (1901–1965), American blues musician
 Melvin Newbern (born 1967), American basketball player

Places in the United States 
 Newbern, Alabama
 Newbern, Indiana
 New Bern, North Carolina
 Newbern, Ohio
 Newbern, Tennessee
 Newbern, Virginia

Other uses 
 New Bern, Kansas, a fictional city in the TV series Jericho